This article lists events that occurred during 1995 in Estonia.

Incumbents

Events
27 February – The Union Bank of Finland opened a branch in Estonia, being the first foreign bank to open a branch in Estonia.
March – elections for VIII Riigikogu.

Full date unknown
 Click OK, an Estonian pop music group is formed.

Births

Deaths

See also
 1995 in Estonian football
 1995 in Estonian television

References

 
1990s in Estonia
Estonia
Estonia
Years of the 20th century in Estonia